Danish Unity is a political party in Denmark, founded in 1936 by Arne Sørensen. In 1939 the National Unity party, established by Victor Pürschel in 1938, merged with the party. It contested elections in 1939, 1943, 1945, 1947, April 1953 and then once more in 1964.  It remains as a political organisation.

In the March 1943 general election - relatively free, though held under German occupation - the party took a clear anti-occupation position, and gained 2.2% of votes castBased on a form of Christian nationalism, it presented itself as a third way'' between socialism and liberalism.

It later campaigned against Danish membership in the EU.

In October 2013, Morten Uhrskov Jensen replaced Adam Wagner as national chairman, since then the organization have had an increase of members. It is currently collecting signatures in order to get on the ballot for the next Folketing election. It has one elected representative, a councillor in Herning.

References

External links
Dansk Samling website (Danish)

1936 establishments in Denmark
Eurosceptic parties in Denmark
Nationalist parties in Denmark
Political parties established in 1936